"4, 3, 2, 1" is the first single by k-os from the album Yes!. The music video premièred in February 2009. The song samples "Soul Flower (Remix)" by The Pharcyde.

Song meaning
The lyrics of "4, 3, 2, 1" question the presence of conflict in the world ("What we fighting for/I don't know what for"). In the first verse, k-os states that he thought [the world] would stay real, but that people "sold their souls for the golden goose" and changed in order to become successful. However, he states that "the truth is as long as [he] keeps rhyming". He remembers that people used to be peaceful and now conflict is starting to appear; but he shrugs it off ("doesn't really matter, I've got to go") and proceeds into the chorus. In the second verse, k-os says that although some people may have wronged him, he lets it go and "acts uncouth". But he adds that it's "just an act"; otherwise he may react negatively and cause more conflict. He states that it is part of his nature to act this way, and that despite he may feel upset, he still maintains a positive image.

Music video
The stop-motion-style video for "4, 3, 2, 1" features k-os and his crew in a closed mall at night, break dancing and playing hockey, among other activities.

The video starts with a shot of two aisles running side by side, then goes to k-os and his crew dancing as they head into the mall. k-os walks around an aisle dressed as a janitor and mops the floor beside a tall mannequin in a suit, who slowly begins to dance. He then slides along the floor with the mop as his two crew members dance. A man is shown sliding down rows of tables in the food court.

Then k-os, still mopping the floor, opens an electronics store and takes a music player out of its package. He puts some headphones on a female mannequin and she begins to dance. Back in another store, k-os is shown speaking into a walkie-talkie as a member of his crew rides a scooter and the other break dances.

In a different store, k-os and a mannequin who are dressed like ninjas begin to fight as k-os sings into a microphone. k-os and his crew also play a game of hockey in the first store along with Matte Babel.

Clips are then shown featuring k-os, his crew, and the mannequins break dancing. The video ends with k-os struggling to reach his microphone while being pulled back away from it, and it fades into white as k-os disappears.

This video was shot at the Gerrard Square shopping center in downtown Toronto, Canada.

Remix
The official remix was produced by TheSoundCrate.

Peak chart positions

References

External links
 

2008 singles
K-os songs
2008 songs
EMI Records singles